The French Party, presenting itself as the Constitutional Party, was one of the three informal early Greek parties that dominated the early political history of Modern Greece, the other two being the Russian and the English Party.

History and party development
The creation and evolution of these Parties was the effect of the interest that the three Great Powers (the United Kingdom, France and Russia) displayed for Greek affairs. As a result, they counted on the hope that Greeks had, that by supporting them those countries would also help the Greek Kingdom to fulfill its expectations for economic progress and territorial expansion.

The French party began as a political faction founded by Ioannis Kolettis during the Second National Assembly at Astros in 1824. Kolettis was the most powerful political leader emerging from the assembly and that added strength to his faction.

The parties were also defined by the so-called "Three Intrigues" by which each faction supported a post-revolutionary leader of the respective power. The French faction supported the Duke of Nemours, second son of Louis Philippe, future king of France in 1830. The other factions responded by supporting others for the throne.

During the Governorship of Ioannis Kapodistrias, the French party and English party were both opposed to the ruling Russian (or Napist) party. This coalition would continue under the rubric of demanding a written constitution. By 1831 or 1832 as the new Bavarian monarch, Otto was being selected as king, the French party was firmly established by Kolettis.

The party had support in Central Greece, especially Euboea, but was also strong among Peloponesian landowners, such as of the Deligiannis faction.

References

Sources
 
 

Defunct political parties in Greece
France–Greece relations
Political parties established in 1824
1824 establishments in Greece